Viipurin kaunotar (Finnish: The Beauty from Viipuri) is a historical novel by Finnish author Kaari Utrio.

Novels by Kaari Utrio
1973 novels
Tammi (company) books
History of Vyborg
20th-century Finnish novels
Finnish historical novels